Rozanne Gold is an American chef, journalist, cookbook author, and international restaurant consultant. A four-time winner of the James Beard Award, she is a graduate of Tufts University in psychology and education, and holds an MFA in poetry from the New School for Social Research in New York City.

Career
Rozanne was first chef to New York Mayor Ed Koch at the age of 23 and has cooked for Presidents and Prime Ministers.  She is best known for the trends she has inspired, including "The Minimalist" column in The New York Times (which was based on her cookbook Recipes 1-2-3), Little Meals, which began the grazing craze; Cafe Greco, New York's first Med-Rim restaurant;  Hudson River Cuisine for the 3-star Hudson River Club, and much more.  Gold is Chef-Director of the restaurant consulting firm, Baum+Whiteman, best known for creating Windows on the World; the Rainbow Room, where Gold was consulting chef and an owner from 1987 to 2000, and three of New York's three-star restaurants.

She is the author of twelve cookbooks, including the award-winning 1-2-3 cookbook series.  Her latest cookbook, Radically Simple: Brilliant Flavors with Breathtaking Ease, was hailed as one of the year's "best" by The New York Times, People, and Good Morning America.  Rozanne Gold is a well-known food writer and journalist who has written more than 600 articles for national magazines, newspapers, and blogs.  These publications include
Bon Appetit, Gourmet, Cooking Light, The New York Times, The Wall Street Journal, and The Huffington Post. In order to save it from its demise, Ms. Gold purchased the Gourmet cookbook library and donated it to New York University.  Ms. Gold is a contributor to Savoring Gotham (Oxford University Press, 2015), 1001 Restaurants to Experience Before You Die (Barrons, 2014), and wrote the foreword to Fresh Cooking by Shelley Boris (Monkfish Publishing, 2014.)  A well-respected moderator, she appeared at the New School's Gotham on a Plate (2015) and Les Dames d'Escoffier's The Next Big Bite (2015) public forums.  Her poetry has been published by Blue Lake Review, The Loom, and Villanness Press.  She is a featured contributor to Cooking Light magazine and a blogger for the Huffington Post.  Her career has been featured in Business Week, More, Mirabella, Gourmet, Cooking Light, Bon Appetit, Savoring Gotham, among many other publications. She is a frequent guest on National Public Radio and was among the first chefs on the Food Network.

Rozanne is past President of Les Dames d'Escoffier, New York and is a trustee of The New York Zen Center for Contemplative Care. She graduated from Tufts University cum laude, did graduate work at New York University, and has an MFA in poetry from the New School. She works as an end-of-life care doula at various New York City hospices. Her poetry can be found in several on-line and print publications.

Personal life
Rozanne grew up in Queens, New York with her parents, Marion and Bernard Gold, and her brother, Leon Gold. Her father, Bill (Bernard) Gold scored the winning touchdown for the 1943 Sugar Bowl (as a fullback for the Tennessee Vols), and was later drafted by the Washington Redskins. Bill, who grew up in Brockton, Massachusetts was Rocky Marciano's sparring partner. Rozanne's mother, Marion Gold, grew up in Pahokee, Florida, attended the University of Miami, and was a medical secretary and teacher. Gold now lives in Brooklyn, New York. Her husband, Michael Whiteman, is an international restaurant consultant, and president of Baum + Whiteman, the company that created five of New York's three-star restaurants, including the Rainbow Room and Windows on the World. [www.baumwhiteman.com] Their son, Jeremy Whiteman, is a computer consultant and photographer in San Bruno, California, and their daughter, Shayna DePersia, is a graduate student at the Bank Street College of Education.

Books

Articles
 Gold, Rozanne. "The Giulianis' Front Burner." The New York Times, January 29, 1994, Op-Ed
 Gold, Rozanne. "A Fool for Food? Try Some of These.” The New York Times, March 20, 1994, The Living Section; C1, C8.
 Gold, Rozanne. “A Region’s Tastes Commingle in Israel.” The New York Times, July 20, 1994, The Living Section; C1, C 6.
 Gold, Rozanne. “Letter To The Editor: Inventive Chefs Are Cooking From History,” The New York Times, July 22, 1999.
 Gold, Rozanne. “Subtle Variations Lift an Already Sublime Dessert.” The New York Times, June 21, 2000.
 Gold, Rozanne. “A Real Italian Import Puts Imitators to Shame.” The New York Times, July 5, 2000, F2.
 Gold, Rozanne. “A Chill in the Air for Free-Range Chickens.” The New York Times, July 26, 2000, F5.
 Gold, Rozanne. “Letters.” The New York Times Magazine. February 23, 2003. [In response to: Dominus, Susan. Everybody Has a Mother, The New York 
Times, February 9, 2003.]
 Reynolds, Jonathan. Produced by Rozanne Gold. “Have It Their Way.” The New York Times, May 4, 2003, Section 6, 78–82.
 Burros, Marian and Rozanne Gold. “American Made: New White House Pastry Chef.” The New York Times, September 1, 2004.
 Gold, Rozanne. “Vinaigrettes Switch Courses, Going Savory and Sweet.” The New York Times, November 17, 2004, F5. 
 Gold, Rozanne. “Jazzing Up the Bird.” The Wall Street Journal, November 12–13, 2011.
 Gold, Rozanne. “The Rules of Recipe Attraction.” The Wall Street Journal, January 14–15, 2012, D7.
 Gold, Rozanne. “Books to Make You Hungry.” Huffington Post, August 21, 2014. 
 Gold, Rozanne. “Chocolate to Live For.” Huffington Post, August 14, 1014.
 Gold, Rozanne. “Olives, Lemons & Za’atar.” Huffington Post, June 15, 2014. 
 Gold, Rozanne. “Farm-to-Tray: Fighting Hunger.” Huffington Post, April 1, 2014.
 Gold, Rozanne. “Techno-Gastronomy in the Big Apple.” Huffington Post, March 16, 2014.
 Gold, Rozanne. “Dessert-on-a-Sheet Pan.” Huffington Post, February 6, 2014.
 Gold, Rozanne. “Dinner-on-a-Sheet Pan.” Huffington Post, February 5, 2014.
 Gold, Rozanne. “Super Bowl Recipe Roundup.” Huffington Post, February 1, 2014.
 Gold, Rozanne. “12 Hottest Food Trends for 2014.” Huffington Post, November 9, 2013. 
 Gold, Rozanne. “One Year Later: 100,000 Meals.” Huffington Post, October 30, 2013.
 Gold, Rozanne. “Read All About It: Israel’s emerging Food Scene.” Huffington Post, October 8, 2013.
 Gold, Rozanne. “Chop Chop: Making Healthy Kids.” Huffington Post, July 20, 2013.
 Gold, Rozanne. “Are blonds Having More Fun?” Huffington Post, June 8, 2013.
 Gold, Rozanne. “The Gaza Kitchen.” Huffington Post, April 29, 2013.
 Gold, Rozanne. “Thinking About Fast Food and Flavor.” Huffington Post, April 23, 2013.
 Gold, Rozanne. “The Power of Packaging.” Huffington Post, April 8, 2013.
 Gold, Rozanne. “Purple Cupcake Day.” Huffington Post, March 24, 2013. 
 Gold, Rozanne. “The Most Sensual Diet.” Huffington Post, February 27, 2013.
 Gold, Rozanne. “Mixed-up Menu Trends.” Huffington Post, February 22, 2013.
 Gold, Rozanne. “Ed Koch’s First Chef.” Huffington Post, February 8, 2013.
 Gold, Rozanne. “Eating Your Way Through 2013.” Huffington Post, December 28, 2012.
 Gold, Rozanne. “Who Needs Quinoa More Than You Do?” Huffington Post, November 30, 2012.
 Gold, Rozanne. “Seeing Stars and What They Mean: Michelin Magic.” Huffington Post, October 4, 2012.
 Gold, Rozanne. “How I Bought 3,500 Cookbooks and Got 6,317.” Huffington Post, February 8, 2012.
 Gold, Rozanne. “Food Trend: POP Goes Peru.” Huffington Post, September 27, 2011.
 Gold, Rozanne. “French Meal as National Treasure.” Huffington Post, September 19, 2011.
 Gold, Rozanne. “The Enlightened Cook, Radically Simple Cooking:Vinaigrettes Get Saucy.” Cooking Light 26, no. 4 (May 2012): 136–140.
 Gold, Rozanne. “The Enlightened Cook, Simple Cooking: Radically Simple Hannukah.”Cooking Light 26, no. 11 (December 2012): 158–162. 
 Gold, Rozanne. “The Way to a Mayor’s Heart.” The Jewish Week, February 12, 2013.

Awards and honors
James Beard Award
Little Meals—winner, best cookbook, general category (1994)
Recipes 1-2-3--winner, best cookbook, general category (1996)
Recipes 1-2-3 Menu Cookbook—nominated for best cookbook, general category (1998)
Entertaining 1-2-3--winner, best cookbook, entertaining category (1999)
Healthy 1-2-3--nominated for best cookbook, general category (2002)
Leonard Lopate Show with Rozanne Gold, winner, best radio show segment (2009)

IACP/Julia Child Award
Healthy 1-2-3--winner, best cookbook, healthy category (2002)
Entertaining 1-2-3--nominated, best cookbook, entertaining category (1999)

Additional Awards and Honors
Olive Tree Award, Jewish National Fund, (1996)
Hospitality Professional of the Year, Food and Beverage Association of America, (1997)
Drexel Visiting Professor, (2000)
International Association of Audio Information Service, Program of the Year, (2007). For From the Kitchen: “Interview with Rozanne Gold,” InTouch Networks, New York

References

External links 
 Rozanne Gold's Website
 Rozanne Gold's Radically Simple blog
 Rozanne on the Leonard Lopate Show
 New York Times Best Cookbooks of 2010

American chefs
Living people
American cookbook writers
Women cookbook writers
American women chefs
James Beard Foundation Award winners
Year of birth missing (living people)
21st-century American women